Giuseppe Buttari (born 16 February 1951) is a retired Italian hurdler. His personal best time was 13.70 seconds, achieved in September 1979 in Mexico City. The Italian record currently belongs to Andrea Giaconi with 13.35 seconds.

Achievements

National titles
He won 10 national championships at individual senior level.
Italian Athletics Championships
100 m hs: 1972, 1974, 1975, 1976, 1978, 1979
Italian Indoor Athletics Championships
60 m hs: 1973, 1975, 1978, 1980

See also
 110 m hurdles winners of Italian Athletics Championships

References

External links
 

1951 births
Living people
Italian male hurdlers
Athletes (track and field) at the 1972 Summer Olympics
Athletes (track and field) at the 1976 Summer Olympics
Olympic athletes of Italy
Mediterranean Games silver medalists for Italy
Athletes (track and field) at the 1979 Mediterranean Games
Mediterranean Games medalists in athletics
Sportspeople from the Province of Latina